Daniel Sáez may refer to:

Daniel Sáez (motorcycle racer, born 1985), 125cc World Championship motorcycle racer between 2005 and 2008
Daniel Sáez (motorcycle racer, born 1996), British Motostar Championship competitor
Daniel Luis Sáez (born 1994), Cuban footballer